Sølensjøen is a lake in Rendalen Municipality in Innlandet county, Norway. Sølensjøen has abundant populations of Arctic char, trout, grayling, whitefish, pike, burbot and perch, which has made it the locale of Norway's largest inland fishing village Fiskevollen which is located on its northwestern shore.

See also
List of lakes in Norway

References

Rendalen
Lakes of Innlandet